Eleuterio or Eleutério is a given name. Notable people with the name include:

Eleuterio Maisonnave y Cutayar (1840–1890), Spanish politician, Minister of State in 1873, under President Francisco Pi y Margall
Eleuterio Felice Foresti (1793–1858), Italian patriot and scholar
Eleuterio Francesco Fortino (1938–2010), Italian priest of the Italo-Albanian Catholic Church
Laureano Eleuterio Gomez (1889–1965), the 18th President of Colombia, from 1950 to 1953
José Eleuterio González (born 1813), Mexican physician and philanthropist, founder of the UANL and the Hospital Universitario
Eleuterio Fernández Huidobro (born 1942), Uruguayan politician, journalist, and writer
Eleuterio Pagliano (1826–1903), Italian painter of the Romantic period as well as an activist and fighter of the Risorgimento
Eleuterio Quiñones, recurring fictional character in Puerto Rican radio and television, voiced by Sunshine Logroño
Eleuterio Quintanilla (1886–1966), Spanish anarchist, educator and pupil of Francisco Ferrer Guardia
Eleuterio Ramírez (1837–1879), Chilean military figure
Eleuterio Rodolfi (1876–1933), Italian actor, screenwriter and film director
Eleuterio Sánchez (born 1942), known as El Lute, was listed as Spain's "Most Wanted" criminal; later became a published writer
António Eleutério dos Santos (born 1928), former Portuguese footballer
Eleuterio Santos (1940–2008), Spanish footballer
Leandro Eleutério de Souza (born 1985 in Araruama), Brazilian Right Back
Eleuterio Zapanta or Little Dado, (1916–1965), flyweight boxer from the Philippines, twice World Champion

See also
Estadio Arquitecto Antonio Eleuterio Ubilla, multi-use stadium in Melo, Uruguay
Eleuter
Eleutherios (disambiguation)

es:Eleuterio